Bernard Friedman (1896–1984) was a South African politician.

Bernard Friedman may also refer to:
Bernard A. Friedman (born 1943), U.S. federal judge 
Bernie Friedman, American attorney
Bernardas Fridmanas (1859–1939), or Bernard Naftal Friedman, Minister for Jewish Affairs of Lithuania, 1923
B. H. Friedman (1926–2011), American author and art critic